Ukkadai is a village in the Papanasam taluk of Thanjavur district, Tamil Nadu, India. It is the administrative centre of the erstwhile Ukkadai estate.

Demographics 

As per the 2001 census, Ukkadai had a total population of 2,045 with 1,012 males and 1,033 females. The sex ratio was 1021. The literacy rate was 66.63.

References 

 

Villages in Thanjavur district